Katarzynowo may refer to the following places:
Katarzynowo, Konin County in Greater Poland Voivodeship (west-central Poland)
Katarzynowo, Rawicz County in Greater Poland Voivodeship (west-central Poland)
Katarzynowo, Słupca County in Greater Poland Voivodeship (west-central Poland)
Katarzynowo, Warmian-Masurian Voivodeship (north Poland)